Kasaba means "town" in Turkish. As a proper noun it may also refer to;

 Kasaba a village in Kastamonu Province. Turkey
 Kasaba (1997 film), a 1997 Turkish film directed by Nuri Bilge Ceylan
 Kasaba (2016 film), a 2016 Indian Malayalam language film directed by Nithin Renji Panicker

See also
 Turgutlu, a district center in Manisa Province, Turkey